Mihail Gribuşencov (born 30 January 1980) is a Moldovan biathlete. He competed at the 2002 Winter Olympics and the 2006 Winter Olympics.

References

1980 births
Living people
Moldovan male biathletes
Olympic biathletes of Moldova
Biathletes at the 2002 Winter Olympics
Biathletes at the 2006 Winter Olympics
Sportspeople from Saint Petersburg